Sir Stafford William Powell Foster-Sutton (24 December 1897 – 6 November 1991) was a British judge, who served as Chief Justice of Nigeria from 1955 to 1958.

References

1897 births
1991 deaths
Place of birth missing
British expatriates in Nigeria
Colonial Nigeria judges
Chief justices of Nigeria